Charlie Chan at the Olympics (1937) is possibly the most topical Charlie Chan film, as it features actual footage from the 1936 Berlin Olympics. There is also a scene where Charlie crosses the Atlantic in the Hindenburg. This is the 14th film starring Warner Oland as Chan and produced by Fox.

Plot 
Charlie Chan is proud of his oldest son, swimmer Lee (Keye Luke), being chosen to represent the United States at the 1936 Summer Olympics in Berlin. Meanwhile, over the skies of Chan's Honolulu, the "Hopkins plane" is demonstrating an improvement of remote radio control to the US military. The aircraft is hijacked by a concealed stowaway, the device stolen, and the test pilot murdered. When Chan and his astute second son, Charlie Jr. (Layne Tom Jr.), identify the stowaway, he finds only the man's body.

On the passenger list of the only aircraft to leave Honolulu for the mainland after the incident are Richard Masters (Allan Lane) and Yvonne Roland (Katherine DeMille). Masters was the intended test pilot, but injured his shoulder and had to be replaced. He left on the Pan Am Clipper to travel to the Olympics himself as a competitor. Perusing the list, Hopkins (Jonathan Hale) recognizes the name of arms dealer Arthur Hughes (C. Henry Gordon). Chan, Hughes, and the inventor Cartwright arrive before them by taking the Zeppelin Hindenburg.

Aboard Manhattan, Lee Chan suspects Roland of being an "adventuress". He spots her putting a piece of paper in her book, and Hughes taking it. He confides in fellow Olympian Betty Adams (Pauline Moore), Masters' girlfriend.

When the ship docks, German Inspector Strasser, Chan, and Hopkins go to question Roland, only to find her gone and her cabin rifled. Chan is reunited with his son Lee when the latter sneaks into the cabin through a porthole to play detective.

On the train trip to Berlin, Chan learns that Lee saw Roland borrow a camera from Adams. Hughes overhears the pair speculate that the invention was smuggled off the ship in it. Hughes advises Chan to stop investigating, then spots a gun barrel in a passing car and pushes the pair to safety. A shot strikes their compartment window. Later, Hughes arranges for Adams' camera to be stolen, but finds nothing inside.

A hotel maid tries to steal the invention, hidden in Adams' candy box, but is foiled by Chan and Strasser. When she runs to the window to warn her accomplices, Charlie substitutes a book for the device without being noticed. Hopkins insists on keeping the candy box in his hotel suite, where he is visited by Hughes. Chan and a policeman break in when they hear gunfire. They find Cartwright on the floor. He claims Hughes accused Hopkins of taking the device to double-cross the stockholders of his company, then after Hughes left, Hopkins took the invention at gunpoint and slugged him.

Roland takes the candy box to her employer, diplomat the Honorable Charles Zaraka (Morgan Wallace). When they discover the substitution, Roland surmises that Chan has the device. Zaraka sends Chan a ticket to the Olympic opening ceremony. While Chan verbally spars with him and Roland, Lee is kidnapped.

Chan allows himself to be taken to Zaraka to exchange the device for his son. Hopkins is brought in to verify it is the invention; he does (even though it is an imitation with a radio beacon inside). Satisfied, Zaraka orders his men to dispose of the Chans when Hughes and his men burst in. Hughes threatens to kill Lee if Chan does not produce the real equipment, but the police arrive just in time to rescue the detective. Hopkins is found unconscious from a gunshot in another room. Cartwright accuses Hughes of the shooting, but Chan proves that Cartwright was responsible for that and also the murder of his accomplice back in Honolulu. Afterward, Lee wins the 100 meter swim.

Cast 
 Warner Oland as Charlie Chan
 Katherine DeMille as Yvonne Roland
 Pauline Moore as Betty Adams
 Allan Lane as Richard Masters
 Keye Luke as Lee Chan
 C. Henry Gordon as Arthur Hughes
 John Eldredge as Mr. Cartwright
 Layne Tom Jr. as Charlie Chan, Jr.
 Jonathan Hale as Mr. Hopkins
 Morgan Wallace as Honorable Charles Zaraka
 Frederik Vogeding as Inspector Strasser
 Howard C. Hickman as Dr. Burton
 Lee Shumway as Cop (uncredited) 
 Wilhelm von Brincken as Polizei Officer (uncredited)
 Jesse Owens as himself

References

External links

Charlie Chan films
1937 drama films
1937 films
American black-and-white films
1930s English-language films
Films about the 1936 Summer Olympics
Films directed by H. Bruce Humberstone
Films set in 1936
Films set in Berlin
20th Century Fox films
1930s mystery drama films
American mystery drama films
Seafaring films
Films set in Honolulu
1930s American films